Bussigny is the name of several places:

Bussigny-près-Lausanne, Canton of Vaud, Switzerland
formerly "Bussigny-sur-Morges"
Bussigny-sur-Oron, Canton of Vaud, Switzerland